Hasimara Air Force Station  is an Indian Air Force (IAF) base located in Alipurduar district, West Bengal, India. Hasimara is located strategically near the Indo-Bhutan border. It is also the closest Indian air base to the Chumbi Valley - the tri-junction between the Indian state of Sikkim, Bhutan and the Tibet Autonomous Region.

History
The Hashimara AFS was established in the sub-Himalayan region of West Bengal after the Sino-Indian War of 1962. It has completed 50 years of operational existence in April 2013. The station was activated on April 7, 1963, when an IAF Caribou aircraft landed and dropped off its first Station Commander, Wing Commander DG King-Lee. The decision to establish the air base here was taken after the 1962 war. The airbase took active part in the Indo-Pak conflict of 1965 and the Indo-Pak war in 1971.

It was home to No. 22 Squadron IAF in India.

Facilities
The airport is situated at an elevation of 340 ft (104 m) above mean sea level. It has one runway with concrete surfaces: 11R/29L measuring 9,000 by 148 feet (2,743 by 45 m).

Assets
In July 2021,the second squadron of Dassault Rafale fighter jets was inducted into No. 101 Squadron IAF at Hasimara.

References

Indian Air Force bases
Airports in West Bengal
Transport in Alipurduar
1953 establishments in West Bengal